Outamba-Kilimi National Park is located in northwest Sierra Leone near the border with the Republic of Guinea. The park is divided into two areas, Outamba (741 km²) and Kilimi (368 km²). The area became a game reserve in 1974, and was formally gazetted as a National Park in October 1995.  The park is named after its highest peak in one part, Mount Outamba, and its longest river in the other, River Kilimi. The area was originally chosen for preservation as it contains a large number of chimpanzees. The vegetation is called woodland savanna, with a mixture of jungle and savanna.

Wildlife

Wildlife includes primates such as chimpanzees, colobus monkeys and sooty mangabeys; hippopotamuses and pygmy hippos; elephants; common warthogs; rare bongo antelopes and over a hundred species of birds. The UN Environment Programme lists the Outamba Area as protected. More information can be seen as a map.

Susu

The Susu (or Soso) tribe live in and around the park and most park personnel are Susu. Some villages were originally in the park itself, but most agreed to move to the buffer zone. An exception was made for those who had ancestral sites and graves within the park. Those who remain have agreed to only harvest using sustainable methods. Mining and hunting are prohibited. The National Tourism Board is attempting to increase tourism in an effect to compensate them for the loss of revenue.

Buffer zone

There is a 1 km buffer zone around the park, where most of the villages are. The restrictions are less here. Hunting is allowed except for certain protected species, farming is practiced and areas of gmelina  trees have been planted to replace the Parkland as a source of wood for use in making furniture, housing and firewood.

Facilities

Simple one bed and group huts are available to sleep in the park. These are made using local materials.

References

External links
Outamba-Kilimi Official Website
Photos of Outamba-Kilimi National Park
Description of park and Chimps
Important Bird Area Factsheet
Susu People

National parks of Sierra Leone
Protected areas established in 1986
1986 establishments in Sierra Leone